Dowlat Abad Metro Station is the southern terminus of Tehran Metro Line 6. It is located next to Imam Ali Expressway.

References 

Tehran Metro stations